The Ponquogue Bridge is a  bridge over Shinnecock Bay in the hamlet of Hampton Bays, New York (within the town of Southampton). Maintained by the Department of Works for Suffolk County, the 29-span bridge carries two lanes of County Route 32 over the bay, connecting Hampton Bays to the eastern end of Westhampton Island. The bridge, which is made of concrete, has a  vertical clearance above Shinnecock Bay. Constructed in 1986 at the cost of $14 million, the bridge replaced an older span over the bay, which was a  wooden drawbridge built in 1930. The former Ponquogue Bridge currently serves as a fishing pier under the current span.

History

Bridge replacement 
In 1976, the original Ponquogue Bridge had its weight limit on the structure reduced from 15 tons to 8 tons due to the neglect condition the bridge had attained. Timbers that sustained the bridge were rotting away, which was part of making the bridge harder to maintain. Discussions between Suffolk County and the United States Coast Guard made it hard to determine the exact location of a new bridge, which was discussed since 1973. In 1977, the county applied for a new bridge to be constructed  from the original structure, costing $6 million (1976 USD) and designed as a bulb-shaped plan. The Coast Guard found that at least  of wetlands would be affected by this new structure and that any proposal for a building permit would be denied.

The Coast Guard called in an engineering firm from New Jersey to design alternatives to the county's proposal, which would attempt to prevent damage to the wetlands. The new structure called for would have approaches  shorter and was eventually accepted by the town board for Southampton in 1980 on a 3–2 vote.

Construction commenced throughout 1986 and opened in January 1987, at the same $14 million structure. The $29,000 girder did not harm anyone working on the project. The old structure had its drawbridge span removed by Suffolk County, but left the former approaches in place. In the time since the bridge was constructed, the old one became a popular fishing pier and in 1997, were renovated for use. Two years later, Suffolk County deemed the approaches of the old bridge to be a "marine park".

References

Bridges on Long Island
Southampton (town), New York
Concrete bridges in the United States
Road bridges in New York (state)
Bridges in Suffolk County, New York